.nr is the Internet country code top-level domain (ccTLD) for Nauru. Domains must be paid, and can be ordered from CenpacNet, Nauru's Internet service provider.

The original configuration of the .nr TLD domain was performed by Shaun Moran of ComTech Communications (Australia) in 1998 as part of the first Internet connectivity on the Island. There was a lengthy process with IANA to get the .nr domain approved and assigned at the time. The setup of .nr was done in 2002 by Franck Martin using specific custom code.

Second-level domains 
In addition to the 2nd level direct domains which the registry offers, these are the official second-level domains under which third-level registrations are offered by the registry:

Usage outside of Nauru 
The .nr domain has low usage outside of Nauru. However, when it is used, it can be found on web domains utilising domain hacks, such as hdm.nr (Headminer), domai.nr (Domainr) or exo.nr (Exonar).

From 2002 to 2018, a domain service freedomain.pro offered free subdomain hosting under the unofficial subdomain "co.nr". As of May 1, 2018, issues with the .nr registry and Nauruan government caused the entire .co.nr domain to shut down and its subdomains to stop functioning.

See also 
 Telecommunications in Nauru

References

External links 
 Delegation Record for .NR Internet Assigned Numbers Authority (IANA)

Country code top-level domains
Communications in Nauru
1998 establishments in Nauru

sv:Toppdomän#N